Tipits Knoll (‘Tipitska Mogila’ \'ti-pits-ka mo-'gi-la\) is the mostly ice-covered ridge extending 800 m in north-south direction and 470 m wide, rising to 1060 m and forming the south extremity of Sofia University Mountains in northern Alexander Island, Antarctica. The knoll surmounts Nichols Snowfield to the southeast. It was visited on 2 February 1988 by the geological survey team of Christo Pimpirev and Borislav Kamenov (First Bulgarian Antarctic Expedition), and Philip Nell and Peter Marquis (British Antarctic Survey).

The feature is named after Tipits Peak in Pirin Mountains, Bulgaria.

Location
British mapping in 1971.

Maps
 British Antarctic Territory. Scale 1:200000 topographic map. DOS 610 – W 69 70. Tolworth, UK, 1971
 Antarctic Digital Database (ADD). Scale 1:250000 topographic map of Antarctica. Scientific Committee on Antarctic Research (SCAR). Since 1993, regularly upgraded and updated

Notes

References
 Bulgarian Antarctic Gazetteer. Antarctic Place-names Commission. (details in Bulgarian, basic data in English)
 Tipits Knoll. SCAR Composite Gazetteer of Antarctica

External links
 Tipits Knoll. Copernix satellite image

Mountains of Alexander Island
Bulgaria and the Antarctic